San Stefano Peak is a rocky peak rising to 256 m, the summit of Rugged Island off the west coast of Byers Peninsula of Livingston Island in the South Shetland Islands, Antarctica.  Situated in the central part of the island, 3.48 km northeast of Benson Point, 4.17 km southeast of Cape Sheffield, 830 m south of Cherven Peak, 1.91 km west of Vund Point, and 1.58 km northwest of Radev Point.

The peak is "named after the settlement of San Stefano in connection with the homonymous Treaty that restored Bulgaria’s nationhood on 3 March 1878."

Location
Spanish mapping in 1992 and Bulgarian in 2009.

Maps
 Península Byers, Isla Livingston. Mapa topográfico a escala 1:25000. Madrid: Servicio Geográfico del Ejército, 1992.
 L.L. Ivanov et al. Antarctica: Livingston Island and Greenwich Island, South Shetland Islands. Scale 1:100000 topographic map. Sofia: Antarctic Place-names Commission of Bulgaria, 2005.
 L.L. Ivanov. Antarctica: Livingston Island and Greenwich, Robert, Snow and Smith Islands. Scale 1:120000 topographic map. Troyan: Manfred Wörner Foundation, 2010.  (First edition 2009. )
 South Shetland Islands: Livingston Island, Byers Peninsula. Scale 1:50000 satellite map. UK Antarctic Place-names Committee, 2010.
 Antarctic Digital Database (ADD). Scale 1:250000 topographic map of Antarctica. Scientific Committee on Antarctic Research (SCAR). Since 1993, regularly updated.
 L.L. Ivanov. Antarctica: Livingston Island and Smith Island. Scale 1:100000 topographic map. Manfred Wörner Foundation, 2017.

Notes

References
 Bulgarian Antarctic Gazetteer. Antarctic Place-names Commission. (details in Bulgarian, basic data in English)
 San Stefano Peak. SCAR Composite Antarctic Gazetteer

External links
 San Stefano Peak. Copernix satellite image

Mountains of the South Shetland Islands
Bulgaria and the Antarctic